John Carmichael (born February 14, 1952) is a former Canadian politician. He was a Conservative member of the House of Commons of Canada from 2011 to 2015 who represented the Toronto riding of Don Valley West.

Background
Carmichael was born in Toronto. He owned and operated City Buick Pontiac Cadillac GMC Ltd. He and his wife Kerry raised three children. His daughter Christin Carmichael Greb was a Toronto City Councillor, serving till October 2018. She was defeated by former MPP Mike Colle.

Politics

Carmichael ran as the Conservative party candidate in the riding of Don Valley West in 2006 and 2008 federal elections, losing both times to Liberals John Godfrey and Rob Oliphant. In the 2011 election, he defeated incumbent Oliphant by 611 votes. He served as a backbench member of the Stephen Harper government.

In 2011, he sponsored a private member's bill called National Flag of Canada Act that provided protections for anyone who wants to fly the flag of Canada. The new law makes it illegal for anyone to prevent someone else from flying the flag. Penalties range from fines to up to two years in jail. Critics called the bill an excuse to enshrine patriotism in law.

In 2015, he was defeated by Oliphant in a rematch of the 2011 election.

Electoral record

References

External links
 Official website

1952 births
Businesspeople from Toronto
Conservative Party of Canada MPs
Living people
Members of the House of Commons of Canada from Ontario
Politicians from Toronto
21st-century Canadian politicians